Shiravand Gandabeh (also Romanized as Shīrāvand Gandābeh) is a village in Gol Gol Rural District, in the Central District of Kuhdasht County, Lorestan Province, Iran. At the 2006 census, its population was 781, in 153 families.

References 

Towns and villages in Kuhdasht County